George Heggie (1870 – 1953) was an Irish-born farmer and political figure in British Columbia. He represented North Okanagan in the Legislative Assembly of British Columbia from 1930 to 1933 as a Conservative.

He came to Canada in 1895 as manager for Sir Arthur Stepney's ranch near Enderby. He served on the council for Vernon and was also a justice of the peace. Heggie was the first president of the Vernon Fruit Union. He was manager of the Land and Agricultural Company in Vernon from 1910 to 1942.

References 

1870 births
1953 deaths
British Columbia Conservative Party MLAs